Katherine Lloyd (or similar)  may refer to:

TV
Catherine Lloyd Burns, actress and writer
Kathy Lloyd, Welsh glamour model and TV presenter

Politics
Katherine Lloyd, political candidate in Stevenage Borough Council election, 2011, England
Catherine Lloyd, political candidate in 2003 National Assembly for Wales election

See also
Katie Lloyd, character in Boston Legal
Kate Lloyd (disambiguation)